Guy Bleus (born October 23, 1950) is a Belgian artist, archivist and writer. He is associated with olfactory art, visual poetry, performance art and the mail art movement.

His work covers different areas, including administration (which he calls Artministration), postal and olfactory communication.

Art and archive
Guy Bleus was born in Hasselt, Belgium. In 1978 he founded The Administration Centre – 42.292 which became a huge art archive with works and information of 6000 artists from more than 60 countries. "Guy Bleus has one of the finest archives of mail art in Europe, if not the world."

Bleus was the first artist who systematically used scents in plastic arts. In 1978 he wrote the olfactory manifesto The Thrill of Working with Odours in which he deplores the lack of interest in scents in the visual arts. Since then he showed smell paintings, mailed perfumed objects and made aromatic installations; he also created spray performances where he sprayed a mist of fragrance over the audience.

Exploring the possibilities of communication media as art media, he investigated the postal system in Indirect correspondence (1979) and searched for an alternative postal system in Airmail by balloons. Together with Charles François he was a pioneer using a computer connected to a modem for artistic communication (in 1989). He also applied reproduction media such as Microfilm, CD-ROM and DVD-ROM for artistic reasons.

Performance works

One of his performance works from the 1980s was documented in the artists' periodical Force Mental. The performance took place in the venue Il Ventuno in Hasselt, and is described as follows: 
"Guy Bleus wears a costume made of official stamps of 1/2fr. He cuts his moustache into a Hitler-moustache. Against the wall he hangs photocopies of Hitler's head. Enlargements whereby the moustache is growing bigger (till A3 format). Bleus sticks then stamps, the same as of which his costume is made of and stamps them with his number-stamp: 42.292. Then he sticks a naked girl full with stamps of 1/2fr and stamps them with the number stamp. Finally he cuts off his Hitler-moustache and breaks a mirror."

Another fascinating performance of Bleus is called 'Value Shredder' (1982, Brussels, Gallery Entr'Act). Bleus took hundreds of real 50 Belgian franc banknotes and made a suit out of them. Wearing this suit he began his performance. He gave the audience plastic raincoats to put on and asked them to hand over their identity cards. He put the cards into a paper shredder, then tore up Mein Kampf and threw the pages into the shredder too. When everything was completely shredded he blew odours and flour over the public with a fan. Finally, he removed his suit and set it on fire. After the performance the public received an identity card from planet Mars. A life-size photo of Bleus's money suit is part of the art collection of the National Bank of Belgium (NBB).

To honor the Italian artist Guglielmo Achille Cavellini Guy Bleus organized the four-day "Cavellini Festival 1984" in the cities of Antwerp, Brussels, Eeklo, Hasselt, and Tienen. In the administrative performance "First President of the USE" in Brussels, capital of Europe, Bleus officially declared Cavellini the very first president of the United States of Europe.

Networking and projects

Numerous are the international art projects Bleus has organised, such as Are you experienced? L.H.F.S. (1981), W.A.A.: Mail eARTh Atlas (1981–83), Telegraphy (1983), Aerograms (1984), Cavellini Festival 1984, Art is Books (1991), Fax Performances (1992–1993), Private Art Detective: Sealed Confessions, and Building Plans & Schemes (1993).

He wrote and published many essays on the subject of networking art. About his essay Exploring Mail Art (1984), Géza Perneckzy wrote: “The study of Guy Bleus outranks all other publications with its theoretical weight and conciseness.” Moreover, he contributed to significant publications, such as Piotr Rypson’s Mail Art, Chuck Welch's Eternal Network, A Mail Art Anthology, or Vittore Baroni’s Postcards – Cartoline d’artista. He participated in many artists' periodicals.

From 1994 till 1999 he opened in Hasselt the art gallery E-Mail-Art Archives. In this non-profit space more than 40 events of mail art, fax art and Internet art took place. Artists such as Ben Vautier, Shozo Shimamoto, Anna Banana, Julien Blaine, H.R. Fricker and Clemente Padin were exhibited.

In 1995 he edited The Artistamp Collection, the first mail art catalogue on CD-ROM. With the participation of networking artists such as Vittore Baroni, Ken Friedman, John Held Jr., Ruud Janssen, György Galántai, Pawel Petasz and Géza Perneczky, he published in 1997 the first E-Mail-Art & Internet-Art Manifesto, an issue of his electronic zine.

After a bureaucratic venture of 20 years he realised in 2003 (together with Jean Spiroux) the very first postage stamp on the theme mail art edited by an official Postal Service. It was an edition of 4 million copies realised by the Belgian Postal Service.

In 2005–2006 Bleus organised the olfactory mail art project Scents, Locks & Kisses with 778 artists from 43 countries in the Art Museum Z33. The website is a slideshow with all the works of the participating artists.

A retrospective of his work was held in the Cultural Centre of Hasselt in 2010. The publication Pêle-Mêle: Guy Bleus® – 42.292 had bracts perfumed with lavender essence and included a re-edition of his ID from planet Mars of 1979.

Bibliography

 Gajewski, H. Mail Art Handbook, The Open University, Amsterdam, 1983 
 Rypson, P. Mail-Art – Czyli Sztuka Poczty, Akademia Ruchu, Warszawa, 1985
 Welch, C. Networking Currents, Sandbar Willow Press, Boston, 1986
 Truck, Fred. Guy Bleus, in: The Memory Bank, Des Moines University, 1986
 Ruch, G. (editor). MA-Congress 86, Out-press, Geneva, 1987
 Fricker, H.R. I Am A Networker (Sometimes) , St. Gallen 1989
 Held, J. World Bibliography of Mail Art, Dallas Public Library, 1989
 Broi, G. La posta in gioco. La comunicazione postale come creatività artistica, Pres. del consiglio del ministri, Florence, 1990
 Held, J. Mail Art: An Annotated Bibliography, (Foreword: G.Bleus), Scarecrow Press, 1991.
 Rypson, P. Mail-Art – Czyli Sztuka Poczty, National Museum, Warszawa, 1991
 Laszlo, J.-N. Timbres d'artistes, Musée de la Poste, Paris, 1993
 Meyer, P. Mailed Art in Uppsala, Upsala, 1994
 Urbons, K. Elektrografie, DuMont Buchverlag, Cologne, 1994
 Welch, C. Eternal Network: A Mail-Art Anthology, Alberta, University of Calgary Press, 1994
 Held, J. (Ed.), Guy Bleus: Selected Writings, Stamp Art Gallery, San Francisco, 1996
 Hamard-Wang, N. Mail Art Networking, entre communication et esthétique, Université de Paris, 1996
 Baroni, V. Arte Postale: Guida al network della corrispondenza creativa, Bertiolo, 1997
 Perneczky, G. Mail Art: An Essay, in Rampike, Vol. 8 # 2, 1997
 Held, J. Rubber Stamp Art, Bertiolo, AAA-edizioni, 1999
 Felter, J.W. Artistamps – Francobolli d’Artista, Bertiolo, AAA Edizioni, 2000
 Löbach-Hinweiser, B. Artists’ Banknote Works, Cremlinge, 2000
 Saper, Craig J. Networked Art, University of Minnesota Press, 2001
 Castellin, Ph. Doc(k)s : mode d'emploi - histoire, formes & sens des poésies expérimentales au XXe siècle, Ed. Al Dante, Paris, 2002. 
 Siegmann, R. Mail Art, Art postal – Art posté, Paris, 2002
 Perneczky, G. Correspondence Works & Labels, Köln, 2003
 Blaine, J. Mail Art 2003, VAC, Ventabren art contemporain, 2003
 Starbuck, M.K. Clashing and Converging: Effects of the Internet on the Correspondence Art Network, Austin, University of Texas, 2003
 Chandler, A. & Neumark, N. (Ed.). At a distance: precursors to art and activism on the Internet, MIT Press, Cambridge (MA), 2005
 Baccelli, V. Arte Postale – Mail art, Tesseratto Editore, Seville (E), 2009
 Lomholt, N.P. & Denhart, L.A. Lomholt Mail Art Archive, Formular Press, Denmark, 2010
 Gutiérrez Marx, G. Artecorreo: Artistas Invisibles en La Red Postal 1975–1995, Buenos Aires, Luna Verde, 2010
 Sousa, P. (Merzmail). Mail Art – La Red Eterna, L.U.P.I., Sestao, 2011
 Held, J. Where the Secret is Hidden: Collected Essays, 1979–2011 – Part 1 & 2, Bananafish Publications, Sacramento and San Francisco, CA, 2011
 Bleus, G. Social Mail-Art, in: Boschi, A. 50 Years of Mail Art: 1962–2012, Museo Civico e della Mail Art di Montecarotto, p. 46-47, 2012
 dj readies (Craig J.Saper). Intimate Bureaucracies: A Manifesto, Brooklyn, NY: punctum books, 2012. 
 Holsbeek, D. Guy Bleus, in: Landscape of Images, ed. Eurlings, Ellen (e.a.), Hasselt, 2012. 
 Chiarlone Debenedetti, B. Art through Postal Service, Gruppo Editoriale L'Espresso S.p.A., ilmiolibri, Roma, 2013
 Galántai G. & Klaniczay J. (Ed.). Artpool: The Experimental Art Archive of East-Central Europe, Budapest, 2013. 
 Crombez, T. Arm theater in een gouden tijd. Ritueel en avant-garde na de Tweede Wereldoorlog, Lannoo, Leuven, 2014. 
 Ramon, R. Vorm & Visie. Geschiedenis van de Concrete en Visuele Poëzie in Nederland en Vlaanderen, Poëziecentrum, Ghent, 2014. 
 Pianowski, F. Análisis Histórico del Arte Correo en América Latina, Universitat de Barcelona, 2014
 Held, J. Small Scale Subversion: Mail Art & Artistamps, TAM-Publications, Breda, 2015. 
 Sarenco, Benetton L., De Vree J. Visual Poetry in Europe, imago mundi, Luciano Benetton Collection, Antiga Edizioni, 2016. 
 Bleus, G. Communication: 44 Statements, in: Cook, S. (ed.), Information, Whitechapel: Documents of Contemporary Art, The MIT Press, 2016. 
 Pas, J. Artists' Publications: The Belgian Contribution, Koenig Books, London, 2017. 
 Vuegen, Ch. Artministrator Guy Bleus in CIAP, Hasselt, in: H Art magazine # 178, 22/02/2018, p. 10
 Rota, A. Mail Art: l'eternal network dell'arte postale, Università Ca'Foscari Venezia, 2018.
 Wilson-Brown S., Smell Is All Around Us, in : "The Global Impacts and Roles of Immersive Media", ed. by J. Ford Morie & K. McCallum, IGI Global; Hershey PA, 2019

Publications by Guy Bleus-42.292

Artists’ books, magazines and catalogues
 Subterranean II, Academy of Arts, Ghent, 1970
 Het Spiegelbeeld, Tongerse Kunstkring, Tongeren, 1974
 Subterranean II, Tongerse Kunstkring, Tongeren, 1975
 Are You Experienced: L.H.F. S., VUB, University, Brussels, 1981
 Mail-eARTh, De Warande, Turnhout, 1981
 Book of Scents, TAC-42.292, Wellen, 1982
 Arbeidsreglement, TAC-42.292, Wellen, 1982
 Mail-Art: Initiation, Ciap, Hasselt, 1983
 Administration: Telegraphy and Mail Art Project, Provinciaal Museum, Hasselt, 1983
 Man is The Museum of All Things, Esmeralda, Ghent, 1983
 W.A.A.: World Art Atlas, De Warande, Turnhout, 1983
 B:13 – Bambú 13, TAC-42.292, Wellen, 1984 (1992)
 B.T.S. – Commonpress 56, Het Toreke, Tienen, 1984
 20x Communication, SHIVKV, Genk, 1986
 Audio Art: Screams (Against Bureaucracy), Provinciaal Museum, Hasselt, 1989
 Art is Books: Artists’ Books, PCOB, Hasselt, 1990
 Huurboekje, Rent book, TAC-42.292, Wellen, 1990
 Mail-Art Manual Do Viajante em Portugal, Cultuurcentrum, Heusden-Zolder, 1991
 Fax-Performances, C.C. Heusden-Zolder, 1992
 A Networking Fax-Project & Performance, De Fabriek, Eindhoven, 1993
 Building Plans & Schemes, C.C. Heusden-Zolder, 1993
 The Timeless Calendar, Vaes & Il Ventuno, Neerpelt, Hasselt, 1993
 E-Pêle-Mêle: Electronic Mail-Art Netzine, TAC–42.292, Hasselt, 1994–1998
 Mail-Art: A Dialogue between the Postman and his Electronic Shadow, PCBK & TAC-42.292, Hasselt, 1994
 In a memory of Ray Johnson, TAC-42.292, Hasselt, 1995
 Mail-art Memorabilia, Postal Museum, Brussels, 1995
 The Artistamp Collection, Centrum voor Kunsten, Hasselt, 1995
 Sealed Confessions: Private Art Detective / Werken met geuren, The Thrill of Working with Odours, C.C. Heusden-Zolder, 1996
 Re: The E-Mail-Art & Internet-Art Manifesto, TAC-42.292, Hasselt, 1997
 Working in A Coal-Mine: Fax- & Internet-Art Project, Our House, Genk, 1997
 Re: The E-Mail-Art & Internet-Art Manifesto – Part II, TAC-42.292, Hasselt, 1998
 Kunstenaarsboeken, (artists’ books), Literair Museum, Hasselt, 1998

CD-ROM and DVD-ROM
 The Artistamp Collection: with an X, E-Mail-Art Archives, Hasselt, 1996
 The Artistamp Collection: without an X, E-Mail-Art Archives, Hasselt, 1996
 Eutopia, Het Gouvernement, Maastricht, 1997
 Desks: 1001 Bureaus, Centrum Beeldende Kunst, Groningen, 1998
 1899 Gezelle 1999, Visual poetry – Net poetry, Bruges, 1999
 Artbiorix, De Velinx, Tongeren, 2000
 S:L:K – Olfactory Mail Art project, Z33, Hasselt, 2005

References

External links
 mailart.be
 John Held Jr.
 Matt Ferranto
 
 Mail artists Index
 Merzmail
 Iuoma

Living people
People from Hasselt
Belgian performance artists
Belgian contemporary artists
Belgian installation artists
Postmodern artists
1950 births
Olfactory art
Visual poets